Bob Picozzi (born June 4, 1951) is a television and radio announcer who was employed by ESPN and Fox Sports as a play-by-play announcer for college football and basketball.

Biography
Picozzi was born in Summit, New Jersey, and graduated from Seton Hall University. He graduated in 1968 from Notre Dame High School (Lawrenceville, New Jersey) and was inducted into the school's Athletic Hall of Fame and the WSOU (Seton Hall University) Hall of Fame.

In 1978, Picozzi began a 19-year stint at WTNH-TV as sports director. He was the TV play-by-play voice of UConn women's basketball from 1999-2012. He also called Atlantic 10 football for the Atlantic 10 Network and CAA football for Comcast SportsNet. Picozzi is a four-time winner of the Connecticut Sportscaster of the Year award and received one New England Regional Emmy Award. From 1998 to 2016, he was an ESPN Radio SportsCenter anchor and anchored 62,411 updates. Picozzi began calling college football and basketball for ESPN in 1997 and college basketball for Fox Sports in 2017.

Career timeline
2017–2018 Fox Sports college basketball play-by-play announcer
1997–2017 ESPN college basketball and football play-by-play announcer
1998–2016 ESPN Radio SportsCenter anchor
1999–2012 Connecticut Huskies women's basketball TV play-by-play voice
2007-2011 Comcast SportsNet Colonial Athletic Association football tv play-by-play
1997-2006 (Atlantic 10 Network) Atlantic 10 football TV play-by-play
1978–1997 WTNH-TV sports director
1975-1978 (Fairfield Basketball Radio Network) Fairfield Stags men's basketball radio play-by-play
1973-1975 WNHC Yale Bulldogs men's basketball radio play-by-play
1969-1972 WSOU Seton Hall Pirates men's basketball radio play-by-play

References

1951 births
Living people
American radio personalities
American sports announcers
College basketball announcers in the United States
College football announcers
Regional Emmy Award winners
Hartford Whalers announcers
Notre Dame High School (New Jersey) alumni
People from Summit, New Jersey
Seton Hall University alumni
Women's college basketball announcers in the United States